AStA Wirtschafts- und Sozialstatistisches Archiv (English: AStA Economical and Social Statistics Archive) is a quarterly peer-reviewed scientific journal of statistics published quarterly by Springer Science+Business Media. It was established in 2007 and covers statistical analysis. Articles are in German or English. The journal evolved from the Allgemeines Statistisches Archiv, established in 1890.

Abstracting and indexing
The journal is abstracted and indexed in:
 Scopus
 Academic OneFile
 Expanded Academic
 Research Papers in Economics

References

External links

Statistics journals
Publications established in 2007
Multilingual journals
Academic journals of Germany
Quarterly journals
Springer Science+Business Media academic journals